Doing It My Way is the debut studio album by The X Factor series 3 runner up Ray Quinn. The album was recorded at Capitol Records Tower in Los Angeles in January 2007. It was released on 12 March 2007 and entered the UK Albums Chart at number one the following week, making Quinn the first person ever to have a number-one album without releasing a single. It sold 126,985 copies in its first week, enough to be certified Gold.

Track listing
"Ain't That a Kick in the Head?" (Sammy Cahn, Jimmy Van Heusen) - 2:31
"Fly Me to the Moon" (Bart Howard) - 2:27
"My Way" (Paul Anka, Claude François, Jacques Revaux, Gilles Thibault) - 4:29
"That's Life" (Kelly Gordon, Dean Kay) - 3:13
"Mack the Knife" (Marc Blitzstein, Bertolt Brecht, Kurt Weill) - 3:02
"Smile" (Charlie Chaplin, John Turner, Geoffrey Parsons) - 2:39
"The Way You Look Tonight" (Jerome Kern, Dorothy Fields) - 4:11
"Summer Wind" (Hans Bradtke, Henry Mayer, Johnny Mercer) - 2:44
"What a Wonderful World" (Bob Thiele, George David Weiss) - 2:15
"Mr. Bojangles" (Jerry Jeff Walker) - 3:25
"New York, New York" (John Kander, Fred Ebb) - 3:09

Credits and personnel
(Credits taken from AllMusic and Doin It My Ways liner notes.)

Paul Anka - Composer
David Arch - Orchestration
John III Baker - Music Preparation
Dick Beetham - Mastering
Marc Blitzstein - Composer
Hans Bradtke - Composer
Bertolt Brecht - Composer
Sammy Cahn - Composer
Paula Chandler - Digital Editing, Engineer
Fred Ebb - Composer
Rick Fernandez - Assistant Engineer
Dorothy Fields - Composer
Simon Fowler - Photography
Claude François - Composer
Kelly Gordon - Composer
Jimmy Van Heusen - Composer
Bart Howard - Composer
John Kander - Composer
Dean Kay - Composer
Jerome Kern - Composer
Henry Mayer - Composer
Johnny Mercer - Composer
Bruce Monical - Assistant Engineer
Joanne Morris - Design
Geoff Parsons - Composer
Ray Quinn - Primary Artist
Eric Rennaker - Assistant Engineer
Jacques Revaux - Composer
Robin Sellars - Engineer
J. Neil Sidwell - Orchestration
Richard Sidwell - Music Preparation
Anne Skates - Vocal Arrangement, Vocal Contractor
Paul "Scooby" Smith - Assistant Engineer
Gilles Thibault - Composer
Bob Thiele - Composer
Aaron Walk - Assistant Engineer
Jerry Jeff Walker - Composer
Kurt Weill - Composer
George David Weiss - Composer
Nigel Wright - Conductor, Orchestration, Producer

Charts and certifications

Weekly charts

Year-end charts

Certifications

References

2007 debut albums
Covers albums
Ray Quinn albums